The Blessing of Moses is the name given to a prophetic poem that appears in Deuteronomy , where it is presented as a blessing of the Tribes of Israel by Moses. The poem thus shares its theme with the Blessing of Jacob, but otherwise these two poems have little in common, except for describing one of the tribes as a judge, and another as a 'lion's whelp', though in the Blessing of Moses it is Gad that is the judge and Dan the whelp, whereas in the other poem it is Dan that is the judge and Judah the whelp. Like the Blessing of Jacob, that of Moses contains few blessings, most of the verses describing the condition of the tribes at a later time.

Biblical narrative
Moses begins with praise of YHWH, who had revealed himself to his beloved nation, and then passes on to the blessing of the different tribes. He mentions first the tribes of the south, beginning with Reuben and Judah, and then those of the north, Dan, Naphtali, and Asher. In regard to Reuben there is only a prayer: "Let Reuben live, and not die; and let not his men be few" (verse 6). Simeon seems to be omitted, but this is explained by Joshua 19:1: "Their [the children of Simeon] inheritance was within the inheritance of the children of Judah." For Judah, Moses prays that the Lord may hear his voice, and aid him against his enemies (verse 7). Next comes a lengthy laudation of Levi. After a reference to himself with the words "Who said unto his father and to his mother, I have not seen him " (cf. Exodus 32:26–30), Moses declares that this tribe shall be the teachers of the Law and the priestly representatives of Israel before Yhwh. Benjamin is next blessed as the beloved of Yhwh, "whom the Lord shall cover ... all the day long " (verse 12). By far the greatest attention is given to the tribe of Joseph; its land shall be enriched with all blessings, and it shall enjoy "the precious things of heaven" as well as the good-will of him that dwelleth "in the bush"; its blessing concludes with a comparison of its strength to the strength of the ox and of the horns of the "re'em" (verses 18–17, Hebrew; cf. Joshua, xviii.). The Mount of Tabor and the sandy shore and seacoast figure forth the happiness of the tribes of Issachar and Zebulun (verses 18–19). Gad is as strong as a lion; he selected the land which was to be the last home of the legislator of Israel (verses 20–21; cf. Numbers xxxii.).

Moses then mentions the northern and the last three tribes of Israel. Dan is the lion which leaps from Bashan (verse 22; see Judges 18:1–3, 27, 29; Josh. 19:47–48). Naphtali, whose possessions are to the west and the south, is filled with the blessing of the Lord (comp. Josh. 19:32–39). Last of all comes Asher, who will "dip his foot in oil" and " whose shoes are of iron and brass " (verses 24–25). Here the prophet returns to the opening words of the blessing, praising Yhwh and proclaiming the glory and honor of Israel.

Critical view
According to the modern documentary hypothesis the poem was an originally separate text, that was inserted by the Deuteronomist into the second edition (of two) of the text which became Deuteronomy (i.e. was an addition in 'Dtr2').

The poem notably does not describe Simeon, which may provide a date for the composition of the poem, as Simeon are believed to have gradually lost their tribal identity, since its traditional territory was wholly within that of Judah. The poem also only mentions each tribe briefly, except for the tribes of Joseph and Levi, which may indicate both that the poem originated within the Levite priesthood, within the territory of the Joseph tribes, or more generally the northern kingdom of Israel where Ephraim, part of the Joseph tribe, was the most prominent.

It is difficult to establish the connection of the blessing of Moses with that of Jacob. Most authorities maintain that the former depended directly upon the latter; and their chief argument is based on the passage on Joseph, part of which is contained also in Jacob's blessing. But there can hardly be a doubt (says the JE) that the passage on Joseph in Jacob's blessing was amplified from the material contained in the blessing of Moses. Otherwise a similar argument might be based upon the same arrangement in each blessing of the tribes of Zebulun and Issachar, and upon other points of agreement which, however, indicate a similarity of the matter rather than any direct connection.

Dubious verses
The blessing of Moses, like Jacob's blessing, contains only a few benedictions, most of the verses describing the condition of the tribes at the time of the author. Like the text of Jacob's blessing, the text of these verses is not intact: the beginning (verses 2 and 3) has suffered "much mutilation"; and even with the help of the versions it is impossible to fill the gap. Perhaps the introduction and the conclusion were not written by the author of the blessing itself. Steuernagel, in his commentary on Deuteronomy, points out that the transition from verse 5 to verse 6 and from verse 25 to verse 26 is very abrupt, and that the contents of the introduction and the conclusion are of an entirely different nature from that of the other verses. Verses 26 et seq. seem to connect with verse 5; and the assumption is natural that the benedictory verses were later insertions. Verses 9 and 10 presumably were also the work of a later author.

Probable date of origin
Scholars have reached no agreement as to when the Blessing of Moses was written: proposals range from the eleventh century at the earliest to as late as the sixth century.

The Jewish Encyclopedia (1906) calls it certain that the blessing of Moses is of later date than the kernel of Jacob's blessing. While in the latter Simeon and Levi (compare Genesis 34) are censured on account of their sin and are threatened with dispersion in Israel (Gen. 49:5-7), the blessing of Moses does not mention Simeon at all; and in it Levi appears as the tribe of priests, although not yet assured of the sacerdotal office, nor respected for holding it. Rather he meets with persecutions, and these probably from the persons who dispute his right to the priesthood (Deuteronomy 33:8ff). While in Jacob's blessing Reuben is threatened with the loss of his birthright, the wish is expressed in the other blessing: "May Reuben live, and not die; and may not his men be few." This is a clear indication that Reuben before this time had sunk into a state of absolute insignificance. And while again the passage on Joseph in the one designates a period in which this tribe successfully defended itself against its enemies, the corresponding passage in the other (Gen. 49:22ff) points to a time when Ephraim maintained his power undiminished and defeated his enemies on all sides: "His [Joseph's] glory is like the firstling of his bullock, and his horns are like the horns of unicorns: with them he shall push the people together to the ends of the earth" (Deut. 33:17). This verse certainly refers to a later time than the Syrian wars under Ahab. It more probably refers to the time of Jeroboam II, who was more successful than any of his predecessors in defeating Israel's enemies. It is likely that the passage on Gad alludes to the same period, in which this tribe successfully withstood the Syrians.

August Dillmann's statement (in his Commentary on Numbers and Deuteronomy, p. 415) that the blessing of Judah points to the period immediately after the separation of the two kingdoms is "hardly correct" (JE). He bases his opinion on the fact that the praise of Levi and Benjamin, together with what is said about Judah and Joseph, could apply only to this period. Steuernagel suggests that the allusion might be to the victory of the Edomites (II Kings 14:7), which perhaps put a stop to the distress caused Judah by Edom. Perhaps, also, the allusion might be to the situation described in II Kings 12:18ff. At all events, without stretching a point, such passages as those on Benjamin and Levi may be assumed to refer to the beginning of the eighth century BC, and the passage on Joseph hardly presupposes the period of Jeroboam I. Hence Reuss (Geschichte der Heiligen Schriften des Alten Testaments, p. 213), Cornill ("Einleitung in das Alte Testament," p. 72), and others are justified in considering the blessing of Moses to have originated in the eighth century BC. In any case, none of the verses indicates the authorship of Moses; this tradition is not implied in any feature of the blessing itself, and is merely referred to in the introductory and closing verses (31:30, 32:44a), which are intended to furnish a setting to the poem and to establish the connection between its various sections.

References

References in the Jewish Encyclopedia
 R. H. Graf, Der Segen Moses, 1857; 
 C. J. Ball, "The Blessing of Moses", Proceedings of the Society of Biblical Archeology, 1896, pp. 118–137; 
 A. Van der Flier, Deuteronomium, 1895, p. 33; 
 A. Kamphausen, Das Lied Moses; 
 Klostermann, Das Lied Moses und das Deuteronomium, in Theologische Studien und Kritiken, 1871-1872 (a series of articles).

External links
 Biblical Hebrew Poetry - Reconstructing the Original Oral, Aural and Visual Experience
 Blessing of Moses Reconstructed

Bible content
Book of Deuteronomy
Documentary hypothesis
Texts attributed to Moses